Uwayja, also known as Marsa al 'Uwayja is a village in the Sirte District in Libya.

Populated places in Sirte District
Tripolitania